Toni Jović (born 2 September 1992) is a Croatian professional footballer who plays as a centre-forward for Bosnian Premier League club Posušje.

Club career
Jović made his debut in the German 3. Liga for Sportfreunde Lotte on 25 January 2019, starting in a home match against 1860 Munich, which finished as a 1–1 draw. He left Sportfreunde Lotte in June 2019.

On 19 June 2019, Jović signed a one and a half year contract with Bosnian Premier League club Široki Brijeg. He made his official debut for Široki Brijeg on 11 July 2019, in a 1–2 home loss against Kairat in the 2019–20 UEFA Europa League first qualifying round. Jović scored his first goal for Široki in his first league game with the club, in a 2–2 away draw against Sloboda Tuzla. He left Široki Brijeg after his contract with the club expired in December 2020.

On 18 February 2021, Jović joined Krupa. He debuted in a league match against his former club Široki Brijeg, on 6 March 2021.

Honours
Rijeka
Croatian Super Cup: 2014

Zrinjski Mostar
Bosnian Premier League: 2016–17, 2017–18

References

External links
Profile at DFB.de
Profile at kicker.de

1992 births
Living people
People from Nova Gradiška
Association football forwards
Croatian footballers
HNK Rijeka players
NK Krk players
NK Pomorac 1921 players
NK Grobničan players
FK Borac Banja Luka players
HŠK Zrinjski Mostar players
Sportfreunde Lotte players
NK Široki Brijeg players
FK Krupa players
Águilas FC players
HŠK Posušje players
Second Football League (Croatia) players
First Football League (Croatia) players
Premier League of Bosnia and Herzegovina players
3. Liga players
Segunda Federación players
Croatian expatriate footballers
Expatriate footballers in Bosnia and Herzegovina
Croatian expatriate sportspeople in Bosnia and Herzegovina
Expatriate footballers in Germany
Croatian expatriate sportspeople in Germany
Expatriate footballers in Spain
Croatian expatriate sportspeople in Spain